Thysania is a genus of moths in the family Erebidae. The genus was erected by Johan Wilhelm Dalman in 1824.

Species
 Thysania agrippina (Cramer, 1776) – white witch moth, ghost moth
 Thysania pomponia Jordan, 1924
 Thysania zenobia (Cramer, 1777) – owl moth

References

Thermesiini
Moth genera